Elections were held in the U.S. state of New Jersey on November 3, 2020. 

Due to the COVID-19 pandemic, ballots for voting by mail were sent to all registered voters in the state. Ballots were processed immediately upon receipt. An audit of the ballots was completed in January. The results did not change the outcome and the process was generally considered a success.

Federal offices

Executive
 2020 United States presidential election in New Jersey
Joe Biden carried the state, where he won the majority in 14 of 21 counties.

Legislative
 2020 United States Senate election in New Jersey
 2020 United States House of Representatives elections in New Jersey

Ballot Measures

Polling

Public Question 2, Peacetime Veterans Eligible for Property Tax Deduction Amendment

Public Question 3, Delayed State Legislative Redistricting Amendment

See also
 Elections in New Jersey
 Politics of New Jersey
 Political party strength in New Jersey

Notes

Partisan clients

References

External links
  (State affiliate of the U.S. League of Women Voters)
 
 
 
 

 
New Jersey